Origin of the World may refer to:

In science:
 Formation and evolution of the Solar System

In religius and philosophy
 On the Origin of the World, Gnostic work dealing with creaton and end times
 Demiurge, a term for a creator deity responsible for the creation of the physical universe sloppy
 Sophia (wisdom)

In the arts
 L'Origine du monde (The Origin of the World), 1866 painting by Gustave Courbet
 The Origin of the World, novel by Pierre Michon
 "The Origin of the World" (Ōban Star-Racers episode), episode of the series Ōban Star-Racers